The Belfast–Dublin Main Line is a main and busiest railway route on the island of Ireland that connects Dublin Connolly station in the Republic of Ireland and Belfast Lanyon Place station in Northern Ireland. It is the only railway line that crosses the Republic of Ireland–United Kingdom border.

History
The railway line was built by three separate companies. In 1837 the Ulster Railway began building a railway line between Belfast and Lisburn, which was extended in stages to Portadown in 1842 and as far as Clones by 1863. The Dublin and Drogheda Railway (D&D) built the line between Dublin and Drogheda. The Dublin and Belfast Junction Railway (D&B Jct) linked the Dublin and Drogheda with the Ulster Railway at Portadown. The D&D and the D&B Jct merged in 1875 to form the Northern Railway of Ireland. In 1876 this new company merged with the Ulster Railway and the Irish North Western Railway, forming the Great Northern Railway (Ireland) (GNRI).

The partition of Ireland in 1922 meant that the Irish border passed between Newry and Dundalk, which caused lengthy delays as trains were required to stop at stations on either side of the border for customs examinations. This disruption was eased in 1947 with the opening of facilities for customs checks at Amiens Street station and Great Victoria Street station.

At the same time, the GNRI made its Belfast–Dublin services non-stop with the launch of the Enterprise Express. The GNRI was nationalised by the governments of the Republic of Ireland and Northern Ireland in 1953 as the Great Northern Railway Board, but in 1958 this was split between the Ulster Transport Authority and Córas Iompair Éireann. This led to a running down of rail services in Northern Ireland, leaving only some Belfast commuter lines, the northern route to Derry and the link to Dublin. In 1970 the newly formed NI Railways bought new locomotives and rolling stock for the Belfast–Dublin Enterprise service as well as new diesel multiple units for local services.

Upgrades 
In 2000, the government of the Republic of Ireland developed a National Development Plan, which has seen major investment in infrastructure. Almost the entire railway network, including the Belfast–Dublin line as far as the border, has been upgraded to Continuous Welded Rail, while signalling is controlled using the Centralised Traffic Control system located at Dublin Connolly station.

In addition, in 1997, a set of new De Dietrich Stock coaches were purchased jointly by Northern Ireland Railways and Iarnród Éireann to operate a revamped Enterprise service along with the new Class 201 locomotives.

High-speed rail proposal
In 2020 the Irish Government confirmed it will be launching a study into an approximately 500 km high-speed railway from Belfast via Dublin to Cork and Limerick, which could cost around €15 billion.

Services 
In addition to the inter-city service between Belfast and Dublin, both NIR and IÉ operate local services along the route. NIR operates local services along the northern half of the line (see Belfast–Newry line) between Belfast and Lisburn, Portadown and Newry, while IE operates its Commuter services between Dublin and Dundalk as part of the Dublin Suburban Rail network. In addition, the line between Dublin Connolly and Malahide is electrified and forms part of the DART network.

One early morning weekday IÉ Commuter stopping service also operates from Newry to Dublin Connolly and returns to Newry in the evening.

The line is also used by rail passengers changing at Dublin Connolly onto the DART and also by connecting bus travelling to Dublin Port for the Irish Ferries or Stena Line to Holyhead and then by train along the North Wales Coast Line to London Euston and other destinations in England and Wales.

Dublin to Belfast intercity
Monday to Saturday 
8 trains in each direction 
Sunday
5 trains in each direction

Simulation 
The route has been released as a commercial add on for Microsoft Train Simulator by Making Tracks. It was released in two sections, part one covering Lanyon Place to Dundalk, with part two covering the section from Dundalk to Dublin. It is set during the 2000s.

References

External links

 Irish Rail Dublin Connolly Station Website
 Dublin - Belfast - Dublin Mainline timetable
 Dublin - Dundalk - Dublin Suburban timetable
 Newry - Belfast - Bangor Suburban timetable
 Bangor - Belfast - Newry Suburban timetable

Railway lines in Ireland
Railway lines in Northern Ireland
Great Northern Railway (Ireland)
Transport in Belfast
Transport in County Antrim
Transport in County Down
Transport in County Armagh
International railway lines
Historic Civil Engineering Landmarks
Republic of Ireland–United Kingdom border crossings
Irish gauge railways
5 ft 3 in gauge railways